Brendan Bell (born August 17, 1971 in Milwaukee, Wisconsin) is an American-born Canadian territorial level politician and former cabinet minister.

He was first elected to the Northwest Territories Legislature in the 1999 Northwest Territories general election. He won the Yellowknife South district defeating former Yellowknife Mayor Pat McMahon. He was re-elected by acclamation in the 2003 Northwest Territories general election.

At the beginning of his second term he was appointed to the Executive Council and has been appointed to three portfolios as Minister of Industry, Tourism and Investment, Minister of Justice and Minister Responsible for the Homeless.

He entered federal politics, where he contested the Western Arctic electoral district under the Conservative Party of Canada banner for the 2008 Canadian federal election but lost by 4.4% or 595 votes to incumbent NDP MP Dennis Bevington.

References

1971 births
Living people
Canadian people of American descent
Conservative Party of Canada candidates for the Canadian House of Commons
Members of the Legislative Assembly of the Northwest Territories
Politicians from Milwaukee
University of Calgary alumni